Kelly Gullett (born 6 October 1977) is a retired professional American tennis player who was a doubles specialist. Gullett reached a career-high ATP doubles ranking of world No. 233, achieved on 26 November 2001. He never received an official ATP singles ranking.

Gullett reached 9 career doubles finals with a record of 3 wins and 6 losses which includes a 1–4 record in ATP Challenger Tour finals. Alongside Canadian partner Bobby Kokavec, the pair won the 2001 GHI Bronx Tennis Classic defeating another Canadian-American duo Andrew Nisker and Gavin Sontag 6–4, 6–3 to claim his sole Challenger title.

ATP Challenger and ITF Futures finals

Doubles: 9 (3–6)

References

External links
 
 

American male tennis players
Sportspeople from Dnipro
Living people
1977 births
Pepperdine Waves men's tennis players